1243 Pamela, provisional designation , is a carbonaceous background asteroid from the outer regions of the asteroid belt, approximately 70 kilometers in diameter. It was discovered on 7 May 1932, by South African astronomer Cyril Jackson at the Union Observatory in Johnannesburg. The asteroid was named for Pamela Jackson, daughter of the discoverer.

Orbit and classification 

Pamela is a non-family asteroid from the main belt's background population. It orbits the Sun in the outer main-belt at a distance of 3.0–3.2 AU once every 5 years and 5 months (1,990 days; semi-major axis of 3.10 AU). Its orbit has an eccentricity of 0.05 and an inclination of 13° with respect to the ecliptic.

The asteroid was first observed at Lowell Observatory in November 1929. The body's observation arc begins at Johannesburg in April 1932, or one month prior to its official discovery observation.

Physical characteristics 

Pamela has been characterized as a carbonaceous C-type asteroid by Pan-STARRS photometric survey.

Rotation period 

In October 1999, a first rotational lightcurve of Pamela was obtained from photometric observations by Brian Warner at his Palmer Divide Observatory in Colorado, United States. Lightcurve analysis gave a rotation period of 26.017 hours with a brightness amplitude of 0.49 magnitude. Other lightcurves were taken by the Spanish amateur group OBAS in 2015, as well as by René Roy and Stéphane Charbonnel in France, and Roberto Crippa and Federico Manzini at Sozzago Astronomical Station in Piedmont, Italy, between 2005 and 2010.

Diameter and albedo 

According to the surveys carried out by the Infrared Astronomical Satellite IRAS, the Japanese Akari satellite and the NEOWISE mission of NASA's Wide-field Infrared Survey Explorer, Pamela measures between 66.11 and 76.42 kilometers in diameter  and its surface has an albedo between 0.040 and 0.0484.

The Collaborative Asteroid Lightcurve Link derives an albedo of 0.0474 and a diameter of 70.06 kilometers based on an absolute magnitude of 9.7.

Naming 

This minor planet was named after Cyril Jackson's daughter, Pamela Jackson. The official naming citation was mentioned in The Names of the Minor Planets by Paul Herget in 1955.

Notes

References

External links 
 Asteroid Lightcurve Database (LCDB), query form (info )
 Dictionary of Minor Planet Names, Google books
 Asteroids and comets rotation curves, CdR – Observatoire de Genève, Raoul Behrend
 Discovery Circumstances: Numbered Minor Planets (1)-(5000) – Minor Planet Center
 
 

001243
Discoveries by Cyril Jackson (astronomer)
Named minor planets
19320507